For the film director, producer, writer and actor, see Rex Ingram (director) (1892–1950).

Rex Ingram (October 20, 1895 – September 19, 1969) was an American stage, film, and television actor.

Early life and career 
Ingram was born near Cairo, Illinois, on the Mississippi River; his father was a steamer fireman on the riverboat Robert E. Lee. Ingram graduated from the Northwestern University medical school in 1919 and was the first African-American man to receive a Phi Beta Kappa key from Northwestern University. He went to Hollywood as a young man where he was literally discovered on a street corner by the casting director for Tarzan of the Apes (1918), starring Elmo Lincoln. He made his (uncredited) screen debut in that film and had many other small roles, usually as a generic black native, such as in the Tarzan films.

With the arrival of sound, his presence and powerful voice became an asset and he went on to memorable roles in The Green Pastures (1936), The Adventures of Huckleberry Finn (the 1939 MGM version, opposite Mickey Rooney), The Thief of Bagdad (1940—perhaps his best-known film appearance—as the genie), The Talk of the Town (1942), and Sahara (1943).

From 1929, he also appeared on stage, making his debut on Broadway. He appeared in more than a dozen Broadway productions, with his final role coming in Kwamina in 1961. He was in the original cast of Haiti (1938), Cabin in the Sky (1940), and St. Louis Woman (1946). He is one of the few actors to have played both God (in The Green Pastures) and the Devil (in Cabin in the Sky). In 1966 he played Tee-Tot in the movie Your Cheatin' Heart.

Ingram was arrested for violating the Mann Act in 1948. Pleading guilty to the charge of transporting a teenage girl to New York for immoral purposes, he was sentenced to eighteen months in jail. He served just ten months of his sentence, but the incident had a serious effect on his career for the next six years. In the interim, he invested in the Club Alabam, a famed nightclub located in the Dunbar Hotel in South Central Los Angeles, with partners Joe Morris and Clarence Moore, reopening it as a jazz club.
 
In 1962, he became the first African-American actor to be hired for a contract role on a soap opera, when he appeared on The Brighter Day. He had other minor work in television in the 1960s, appearing in an episode each of I Spy and The Bill Cosby Show, both of which starred Bill Cosby, who used his influence to land him the roles.

Death 
Shortly after filming a guest spot on The Bill Cosby Show, Ingram died of a heart attack at the age of 73. He was interred in Forrest Lawn Memorial Park in Hollywood Hills, California.

Complete filmography

Partial television credits

References

Further reading

External links 

 
 

 

1895 births
1969 deaths
Male actors from Illinois
People convicted of violating the Mann Act
African-American male actors
American male film actors
American male silent film actors
American male soap opera actors
American male stage actors
American male television actors
Burials at Forest Lawn Memorial Park (Hollywood Hills)
Feinberg School of Medicine alumni
People from Cairo, Illinois
20th-century American male actors
20th-century African-American people
Federal Theatre Project people